Mie kangkung (lit: "kangkung noodle"), is an Indonesian vegetable noodle soup with kangkung (water spinach), usually served with bakso meatball and mushroom. It is of a specialty of Betawi cuisine, Jakarta, Indonesia. The yellow egg noodles come with a brown-colored thick soup, made of chicken or beef broth, which is thickened with tapioca, spiced and mixed with garlic and kecap manis (sweet soy sauce). Other ingredients include bakso meatballs, bean sprouts, mushroom, hard boiled quail eggs and sprinkled with bawang goreng (fried shallots) and added with dash of kaffir lime juice and sambal.

See also

Mie ayam
Mie celor
Mie kocok
Mi rebus
Mie goreng
Noodle soup
stir-fried water spinach, or tumis kangkung

References

External links
 Mie Kangkung Betawi recipe (in Indonesian)

Betawi cuisine
Indonesian noodle dishes